Moquegua District is one of six districts of the province Mariscal Nieto in Peru.

References

See also 
 Administrative divisions of Peru